Al-Husayn ibn Ali ibn Muhammad ibn Ja'far ibn Ibrahim ibn al-Walid al-Anf al-Qurashi was the eighth Tayyibi Isma'ili Dāʿī al-Muṭlaq in Yemen, from 1230 to his death in 1268.

Life
He was the son of the fifth Dāʿī, Ali ibn Muhammad ibn al-Walid, and thus a member of the Banu al-Walid al-Anf family, that dominated the office of Dāʿī al-Muṭlaq almost continuously in the 13th to early 16th centuries. The position of Dāʿī al-Muṭlaq ("absolute/unrestricted missionary") was the supreme authority of the Tayyibi community in their capacity as vicegerents of the absent Imam, the eponymous at-Tayyib Abu'l-Qasim, who remained in occultation.

Like his father, al-Husayn had close relations with the Rasulid dynasty of Sana'a, and converted several of their members to Tayyibi Isma'ilism, as well as the Banu Hatim branch of the Hamdanid dynasty of Dhu Marmar. Al-Husayn briefly moved the headquarters of the Tayyibi daʿwa to Dhu Marmar, before returning to Sana'a.

He was also the author of a number of treatises on Tayyibi esoteric doctrine (ḥaqāʾiq), notably the al-Mabdaʾ wa'l-maʿād, which deals with Tayyibi conceptions of cosmogony and eschatology.

He was succeeded by his son Ali, who had been his father's chief assistant.

Works
An 18th-century catalogue of Isma'ili literature attributes several works on Tayyibi esoteric theology (ḥaqāʾiq) to him, held by the Bohras in India. Most of them are unpublished, held in 19th- or 20th-century copies by the Institute of Ismaili Studies of London.

His Risālat al-mabdaʾ wa'l-maʿād ("Treatise on the origin and return"), a brief but concise exposition of Tayyibi doctrine on cosmology and eschatology, was edited and published by Henry Corbin in his Trilogie ismaélienne (Tehran and Paris, 1961).
He has also written the  Risālat Waheedah.
A chapter of another work, Risālat al-īḍāḥ wa'l-bayān ("Treatise of elucidation and explanation") which interprets the story of the Fall of Adam as an allegory for the rebellion and fall of a "cosmic intellect". It was edited by Bernard Lewis in "An Ismaili interpretation of the fall of Adam", Bulletin of the School of Oriental and African Studies Vol. 9 (1938), pp. 691–704, and analysed by Daniel De Smet in "L’arbre de la connaissance du bien et du mal. Transformation d’un thème biblique dans l’ismaélisme ṭayyibite", in Studies in Arabic and Islam. Proceedings of the 19th Congress, Union Européenne des Arabisants et Islamisants, Halle 1998 (Leuven, 2002), pp. 513–521.

References

Sources
 
 

1268 deaths
Year of birth unknown
Banu al-Walid al-Anf
Tayyibi da'is
Ismaili theologians
13th-century Arabic writers
13th century in Yemen
13th-century Arabs
13th-century Ismailis
13th-century Islamic religious leaders